Stephen Kenneth Finney (31 October 1973 – 2 February 2022) was an English professional footballer who played as a forward. He made appearances in The Football League for six clubs.

Playing career
Finney began his career as an apprentice with Preston North End, where he made his professional debut during 1991–92. After just six league appearances he moved to Premier League side Manchester City in February 1993, but he failed to make the first team while at Maine Road.

In the summer of 1995, Finney moved to Swindon Town, scoring 12 times in his first season to help them to the Division Two title. Apart from a loan spell with Cambridge United in 1997, Finney remained with Swindon until July 1998, when he moved to Carlisle United. But before the 1998–99 season had finished, Finney had moved on to Leyton Orient for a short spell with the London club.

Finney spent time on trial with Exeter City in the summer of 1999, and then dropped into non–league football with Barrow before returning to The Football League with struggling Chester City on 18 October 1999 after sending his CV to the club. During his 14-month stint at the club, he failed to score a competitive goal and was part of the side that were relegated to the Football Conference. In December 2000 he joined Altrincham, initially on loan. He scored a hat–trick against Whitby Town in his third game for the club. He scored 11 goals in 24 games during his initial loan spell with the club. Following his release from Chester, he made a single cup appearance for Altrincham before his release.

Personal life and death
Following his retirement from football, Finney worked as a car salesman and business development manager. He also coached Ullswater United in the Westmorland League.

He died on 2 February 2022, at the age of 48.

Honours
Swindon Town
Football League Second Division: 1995–96

References

External links
 (pre-Chester)
 (Chester)

1973 births
2022 deaths
Sportspeople from Hexham
Footballers from Northumberland
English footballers
Association football forwards
English Football League players
National League (English football) players
Preston North End F.C. players
Manchester City F.C. players
Swindon Town F.C. players
Cambridge United F.C. players
Carlisle United F.C. players
Leyton Orient F.C. players
Barrow A.F.C. players
Chester City F.C. players
Altrincham F.C. players